The following is a list of television stations that are affiliated with GTV.

Free-to-air television stations

See also 
 List of Philippine television networks
 List of Philippine media companies

References

 
Philippine television-related lists

ceb:Tala sa mga sibyaanan sa GMA Network
tl:Tala ng mga himpilan ng GMA Network